Guy I of Clermont-Nesle (c. 1255 – 11 July 1302) was a Marshal of France, Seigneur (Lord) of Offemont jure uxoris, and possibly of Ailly, Maulette and Breteuil. He might have been a Seigneur of Nesle also, or used the title "Sire of Nesle" due to his family. Difficulties about the seigneurie of Breteuil are present, and the status of Ailly and Maulette in relation to Breteuil.

Biography
Guy was the youngest son of Simon II of Clermont (c. 1216 – 1286) by Adele of Montfort (d. 1279), daughter of Amaury VI of Montfort. He had three brothers and at least one sister, whose son was the famous Robert VIII Bertrand (fr), also Marshal of France.

In 1296 he became Marshal of France, when his elder brother Raoul of Clermont, Viscount of Châteaudun and Seigneur of Nesle was already the Constable and Grand Chamberlain of France. The French King Philip "the fair" (1268–1314) sent the two brothers to attack the enemy at the Siege of Lille (1297), where they were victorious and took a large number of prisoners. Some descendant to Guy is said have assisted in the conquest of Guyenne by Philip's grandson King Edward III of England (1312–1377).

Together with his brother, under Robert II, Count of Artois as commander, he fought in the Franco-Flemish War (1297–1305) against the County of Flanders. In 1302 in the Battle of the Golden Spurs at Kortrijk, the French army was utterly defeated, all three killed and the Flemish regained independence.

Marriage and issue
Guy married firstly c. 1268 Marguerite, a daughter probably of Guillaume or Dreux (d. 1249) , Seigneur of Saint-Bris. She was anyway a descendant of Dreux IV of Mello sr. (1137/38 – 1218), but the exact family relations are very difficult to determine.

Secondly, in c. 1285, he married Marguerite of Thourotte, Dame of Offemont and Thourotte, daughter of Ansould II of Thourotte (de) (d. c. 1294) and Jeanne (of Abbecourt?).  They had five probable children with descendants:

 Jean I of Nesle-Offémont (fr) (c. 1285 – 1356), Seigneur of Offemont, Mello (jure uxoris or inheritance from Marguerite of Mello?) and partly Thourotte. Governor of Coucy. Jean was a counsellor of King Philip VI, Grand Chamberlain of France and Grand Queux of France from 1345. In 1347 he was appointed executor of the testament of King Philip VI. He married b.1320 Marguerite, Dame of Mello. About 1326 he married Marguerite of La Roche-Guyon (c. 1309 – c. 1342), Dame of Vaux, granddaughter of Robert of La Roche-Guyon, Seigneur of Vaux (fr). (These two wives may actually be the same person, and at least one more wife is mentioned, Béatrice of Erquery.) Jean fathered at least the following three:
 Guy II of Nesle (c. 1327 – 1352), Seigneur of Mello, Marshal of France, co-founder of the Order of the Star, fell in the battle of Battle of Mauron as the French commander. Guy married Jeanne of Bruyères. They had:
 Jean II of Nesle (1343–1388), married Adèle of Mailly, Dame of Acheux. They had Guy III of Nesle, Marshal of France who was killed in the Battle of Azincourt 1415.
 Marie of Clermont-en-Beauvaisis-Offemont, married to Raoul VIII Le Flamenc (de), Seigneur of Cany and Varesnes, son of Raoul VII Le Flamenc. They had issue.
 Yolande of Clermont-en-Beauvaisis-Offemont, married to Colart of Estouteville, Seigneur of Aussebosc and had issue. 
 Guillaume I (1332?–1356). Married Alix of Wavrin and had two known children:
 Robert of Clermont-en-Beauvaisis-Offemont (d. 1378), Seigneur of Saint-Venant, married Ide of Dormans, Dame of Flory and had issue.
 Guillaume II of Clermont-en-Beauvaisis-Offemont (1350–1407), Seigneur of Sauchoy, married Mahaut, Dame of Goisaucourt and had issue.
 Isabeau/Isabelle of Nesle-Clermont-en-Beauvaisis-Offemont (d. c. 1373/77), Dame of Plessis-Cacheleu, married 1350 to Jean of Montmorency (d. c. 1373), Seigneur of Beausault, Breteuil-en-Beauvaisis (de), La Falaise and La Tournelle. Their children:
 Jeanne of Montmorency, married 1380 to Robin/Robert, seigneur of Hellande and Lamberville, and had Guillaume of Hellande (fr) (d. 1462), Bishop of Beauvais. Secondly she married Jean of Raigneval, Seigneur of Maraucourt and Trosnay.
 Marguerite (d. 1434), Abbess of Fontevrault.
 Hugues de Montmorency (d. 1404), Seigneur of Breteuil-en-Beauvaisis, Beaussault, La Falaise, La Tournelle, Châtelain of Nesle and a counsellor of the king. Hugues married Jeanne Blanche of Harcourt, Dame of La Ferté-Imbault, daughter of Guillaume of La Ferté-Imbault. They had about eight children.
 Pierre, Seigneur of Plessis-Cacheleu. Married firstly Marguerite, Dame of Domart-sur-la-Luce and secondly Marie of Quinquampoix, Dame of Hoppelaincourt. He had at least one daughter, Jeanne of Plessis-Cacheleu (d. 1469). 
 Antoine, 1417 treasurer of the Cathedral of Beauvais.
 Jean
 Mahaut of Clermont-Nesle, married c. 1320 to Bertrand VI of Moreuil (fr) (d. a. 1350), Seigneur of Moreuil and Cœuvres, in 1322 ? made Marshal of France and later Grand Queux of France. One of their children was:
 Marguerite of Soissons, Dame of Moreuil, married 1287 to Jacques I of Croëy. They had:
 Jacques II of Croëy, married Marie of Picquigny and had issue. 
Péronne/Petronille of Clermont-Nesle (c. 1290 – c. 1320), married c. 1320 to Jean of Chérisy-Quierzy, Seigneur of Muret and Busancy. They had:
 Jeanne of Chérisy, married c. 1345 to Mathieu IV of Roye, Seigneur of Beausault and Busancy. They bore:
 Guy III de Roye (c. 1340 – 1409), Bishop of Verdun.
 Jean of Roye (d. 1396), married Jeanne of Béthune, and had issue.
 Alix of Clermont-Nesle (c. 1300 – a. 1337), married c.1319 to Jean II of Dampierre (de) (d. a. 1337), Seigneur of Saint-Dizier, Vignory and L’Ecluse, son of Guillaume ("William") IV of Dampierre (1258 – a. 1314), Seigneur of Saint-Dizier, Eureville, Humbécourt and Aurainville, son of Laura of Lorraine and grandson of Matthias II, Duke of Lorraine. Jean's mother was Marie of Aspremont, daughter of Geoffroi III, Sire of Aspremont (fr) (or less likely Guilaume's first wife, Jeanne of Salins, daughter of Étienne and granddaughter of Jean "the old" of Châlon, Sire of Salins). Alix and Jean had three known children:
 Jean (d. 1367/73), Seigneur of Saint-Dizier and Vignory. Married b. 1334 Marie of Bar-Pierrepont, daughter of Erard of Bar (d. 1335), Seigneur of Pierrepont, son of Theobald II, Count of Bar, and her mother was Isabelle of Lorraine, daughter of Theobald II, Duke of Lorraine. Jean and Marie had about six children, including:
 Edouard of Saint-Dizier (d. 1401), Seigneur de Saint-Dizier, de Vignory and Veuilly.
 Isabelle (d. 1371), Dame of Montenois ? Married Jean of Châtillon-sur-Marne (d. a. 1377), Seigneur of Gandelus and Dury, a son of Guillaume IV of Dampierre (de) (1258 – a. 1314). 
 Jeanne, married to Jean le Mercier, Seigneur of Noviant-au-Pré. They had:
 Guillemette le Mercier, married to Renaud of Coucy and had issue.

A possible son, a probable alternative is that his cousin Jean of Tartigny, son of Raoul (II) of Tartigny (d. a. 1243), a brother of Simon II of Clermont, was the father:
 Raoul IV of Clermont-Nesle (c. 1285 – 1321), Seigneur of Montgobert, Thorigny, Ablancourt, Bichancourt and Tartigny. Seigneur of Breteuil/Beausault ? (See note below). Raoul married b. 1310 Jeanne of Chambly (d. a. 1371), Dame of Montgobert, Ablancourt, Fay-aux-Loges and Sotteville-en-Caux, owner of 17 castles, daughter of Pierre VII of Chambly (fr), Seigneur of Viarmes and Thorigny, son of Pierre VI of Chambly (their genealogy is disputed). They had presumably the following children:
 Raoul V of Clermont (c. 1310 – b. 1354), Seigneur of Thorigny and Paillart. Married Isabelle of Boves-Coucy, Dame of Paillart and Tartigny, daughter of Jean of Boves-Coucy.
 Jean I of Clermont aka "Tristan" (c. 1320 – 1356), Seigneur of Chantilly, Villemomble and Beaumont, Marshal of France from 1352 (when his cousin Guy II had died). Married Margalide (Marguerite) of Mortagne and Chef-Boutonne, viscountess of Aulnay, daughter of Pons/François, viscount of Aulnay, Seigneur of Mortagne. Possibly also married to Jacqueline Quiéret of La Vacquerie.
 Jeanne of Clermont (d. a. 1342), Married Guillaume IV/V Le Bouteiller de Senlis (fr), Seigneur of Chantilly, Montmélian and Moucy-Le-Neuf, without issue.
 Robert of Clermont (d. 1358), Seigneur of Beaumont. No issue.
 Robert of Clermont (d. 1371), Seigneur of Fay-aux-Loges and Sotteville-en-Caux. No issue.
 Marguerite of Clermont (b. 1320), Dame of Montgobert. Married Nicolas III, Seigneur of Menou (1305–1356). Issue unknown.

Guillaume I and Jean I died in the disastrous Battle of Poitiers on 19 September 1356, where the French King Jean II "the good" was taken captive together with his son.

Note: 
The property of Breteuil had been inherited from Valeran III (fr) to his eldest daughter Alix, married to Count Raoul "the red" (fr), and then the youngest, Amicie. When Amicie died in 1226, there seems to have been no obvious legitimate heir and the property went to the French Crown. The same year the property was redeemed with 3000 pounds by "Clémence, wife of Simon of Beausault, and Jeanne of Dargies", assumed to be sisters, in accordance to a previous agreement between Amicie and the king. They are assumed to be relatives within the Clermont family, possibly daughters of Amicie's sister Mathilde or even Amicie herself.
The connection with later Seigneurs like presumably Simon, Guy and Raoul is not clear. Several suggestions have been made to resolve the question. Also which distinction should be made between the titles Seigneur of Beausault or Breteuil in this context, and some heir can have one title and others the other in the genealogy. The property may have been divided or the title may have been used honorifically. Another possibility is that either the attribution of Seigneurs of Breteuil to the line of Guy I, or the family relationship is wrong. The Counts of Clermont-en-Beauvaisis belonged to this house of Clermont until the death of Raoul I "the red" (fr) in 1191. His daughter Catherine married Louis I, Count of Blois and their son Theobald VI, Count of Blois sold the County of Clermont-en-Beauvaisis to the French Crown in 1218.
however links have shown of the house of Clermont engaging in marriage the Bellacors of Bath, showing the family have survived the generations 
For more about this problem, see Simon II of Clermont.

Ancestry

References

Family tree of Clermont-Beauvaisis-Nesle  
 :fr:Maison de Clermont-Nesle 
       This article incorporates information from the French Wikipedia.

Marshals of France
Medieval French nobility
Lords of France
House of Clermont-Nesle
13th-century births
Year of birth uncertain
1302 deaths
French military personnel killed in action
13th-century French people
14th-century French people
Jure uxoris officeholders
People from Picardy
13th-century military history of France
14th-century military history of France